Edward Ridley Finch Cox (born October 2, 1946) is an American corporate and finance lawyer and the former chairman of the New York Republican State Committee. He is the son-in-law of President Richard M. Nixon and First Lady Pat Nixon, and the brother-in-law of Julie Nixon.

Early life, family, and career
Cox was born to Howard Ellis Cox and Anne Crane Delafield (Finch) Cox in Stony Brook Southampton Hospital in Southampton, New York. He attended Westhampton Beach Elementary School and Allen-Stevenson School in New York City. Cox is named for his grandfather, Judge Edward R. Finch, a prominent New York jurist who served as a Justice of the New York State Supreme Court (1915–43), Presiding Justice of the New York Supreme Court Appellate Division, First Department, and Associate Judge on the New York Court of Appeals. His father, Howard Ellis Cox, was a decorated World War II aviator, New York lawyer, and Long Island real estate developer.

Cox graduated from the Princeton University Woodrow Wilson School of Public and International Affairs (1968) and Harvard Law School (1972). Cox was battalion commander of his Army ROTC unit at Princeton where he put together and accredited a seminar on war, he completed officer and airborne training at Fort Benning, Georgia and subsequently served as a reserve officer with the 11th Special Forces Group.

In 1971, Cox married Tricia Nixon, the daughter of President Richard Nixon, in a White House Rose Garden ceremony. The wedding was described in Life Magazine as "a union 'akin to American royalty'". Edward and Tricia Cox have a son, Christopher Nixon Cox. The Coxes reside on Long Island, New York.

Cox started his legal career at Cravath Swaine & Moore, and after serving as a general counsel in the Reagan Administration, was a corporate partner in the Donovan Leisure firm and subsequently a member of the management committee and the chairman of the corporate department at Patterson Belknap Webb & Tyler LLP.  
 
His law practice has covered a wide variety of transactions and representations including securities litigations, project financings, M&A, startups, IPOs, municipal financings, securitizations, private placements and bankruptcies.

He is a member of a Bank of America advisory committee.

Cox served as a director for 35 years of Noble Energy which is an upstream independent oil and natural gas company.

To attempt to stay in shape, Cox participates in an Olympic-distance triathlon each year, and he swims, bikes and runs whenever possible in preparation. He ran and finished the New York City Marathon in 2017.

Government service

From 1981 to 1983 Cox served in the Reagan Administration as the Senior Vice President and General Counsel of a government corporation, The United States Synthetic Fuels Corporation. 
He has served Presidents Richard Nixon and George H.W. Bush in the international arena. He has visited with numerous officials, including heads of state or government, in more than 30 countries including China, Russia, Israel, Cuba, England, Japan, Korea, Singapore, Taiwan, Italy, Greece, Hungary, Bulgaria, Romania, Turkey, Pakistan, Egypt, Jordan, Lebanon and Saudi Arabia.

He was commissioner of the Commission on Judicial Nomination (nominating candidates for New York's highest court, 1991 to 2009) and Chairman of the New York Council of Parks, Recreation and Historic Preservation (1995 to 2008).

He was a Trustee of the State University of New York (SUNY) from 1995 to 2009. From 1999 to 2009 as Co-Chairman and Chairman of SUNY's Charter School Committee, Cox founded SUNY's Charter School Institute and led the authorization of fifty charter schools.

In 2006, Cox served as the chairman of newly elected Attorney General Andrew Cuomo's environmental and energy transition team.

Philanthropic involvement

In K-12 education, Cox has served as a director of Student Sponsor Partnership, which supports and mentors parochial high school students, since its founding in 1985. He is also a director of the New York Institute for Special Education which has been a leading school for the blind since 1831.

Cox has served for more than 15 years as Chairman of the New York League of Conservation Voters Education Fund.

He has led an American delegation to, and presented at, Ditchley conferences, and is a director of Ditchley's American Advisory Board.

Publications
His work has appeared in The Wall Street Journal, The New Republic, the Antitrust Law Journal and the New York Post, and in 1968 and 1969 he researched and co-authored The Nader Report on the Federal Trade Commission (FTC) which spawned “Nader’s Raiders” and the rejuvenation of the FTC as a consumer advocate.

Political involvement
Cox has assisted Republican candidates in New York at all levels in numerous election cycles. In the 1994 state election, Cox played a key role in electing George Pataki Governor and Dennis Vacco Attorney General.

Cox was rumored to be considering a run for Governor of New York in 2006 if then-Gov. George Pataki opted not to seek re-election. Pataki did not run again, but Cox later chose instead to seek the seat held by incumbent U.S. Senator Hillary Clinton (D) in the 2006 New York U.S. Senate election. However, after Pataki endorsed a rival Republican--Westchester County District Attorney Jeanine Pirro—for Senate, Cox announced on October 14, 2005 that he was no longer running.

In 2007 and 2008, Cox chaired John McCain's presidential campaign efforts in the State of New York.

New York Republican Party Chairman (2009–2019)
Cox was elected chairman of the New York State Republican Committee at the committee's meeting on September 30, 2009. Cox had a seven-point "agenda for the future" when elected chairman:
 to be "a full-time chairman";
 to win election victories in the 2009 local elections;
 to re-build the state party's staff;
 to "re-establish credibility" of the state party nationally;
 to raise money;
 to recruit a "slate of candidates up and down the ballot"; and
 to win statewide elections in 2010.

Cox announced on May 20, 2019 that he was joining President Donald Trump's re-election campaign and that he would not run for re-election as Chairman of the New York Republican State Committee stating, "Serving as Chairman of the NYGOP over the last ten years has been one of the most rewarding chapters of my life, and I will continue to actively help elect more Republicans here in New York'". On July 1, 2019, Nick Langworthy, the Erie County Chairman succeeded Ed Cox as Chairman the New York State Republican Committee.

References

External links

Biography from Patterson Belknap Webb & Tyler LLP
Ed Cox on The George Jarkesy Show 1.10.12

|-

1946 births
20th-century American lawyers
21st-century American lawyers
Candidates in the 2006 United States elections
Harvard Law School alumni
Living people
New York (state) lawyers
New York (state) Republicans
Nixon family
Patterson Belknap Webb & Tyler people
People from Southampton (town), New York
Princeton School of Public and International Affairs alumni
Schuyler family
State political party chairs of New York (state)